Leigh-Allyn Baker (born March 13, 1972) is an American actress. She had recurring roles on Charmed and as Ellen on Will & Grace, and a starring role as the matriarch Amy Duncan on the Disney Channel sitcom Good Luck Charlie. She also provided the voice of Abby on the computer-animated Nickelodeon series Back at the Barnyard.

Career
Baker has done voice work in video games for the Star Trek and X-Men and guest starred in television shows such as That '70s Show, Early Edition, Yes, Dear and among other series. She also starred in the short-lived 1996 sitcom The Last Frontier and voiced Lu Zhi in the 2010 game Age of Conan: Rise of the Godslayer.

Baker is also known to television audiences for her recurring roles as Hannah Webster in the first season of Charmed and as Ellen, the long-time friend of Grace Adler (Debra Messing) on Will & Grace, a role she played since the show began in 1998 through to its last season in 2006 (and again in 2018, in the show's revival). She is also known for providing the voice of Abby in the Nickelodeon animated series Back at the Barnyard.

In late 2008, Baker appeared on several episodes of Hannah Montana playing Mickey, a morning show host. She starred as Amy Duncan, the matriarch of the Duncan family on the Disney Channel original sitcom Good Luck Charlie, which ran from 2010 to 2014.

Baker has also made an appearance, along with her co-star Mia Talerico, on the sketch comedy show, So Random!

In 2015, she starred in the Disney Channel Original Movie, Bad Hair Day, which she also produced. She plays Liz Morgan, a "down on her luck" cop who must get a priceless necklace by teaming up with high school senior, played by Laura Marano.
In an interview with Variety, Baker said, "I wanted to executive produce because I wanted to see what it was like to build and fulfill a vision from the ground up, and since this was Disney Channel's first movie with an adult lead, I wanted that role to be protected and I wanted the movie to have my creative stamp on it." She also liked that she got to work on the Disney movie because it taps into her family unit fanbase.
In 2016, she starred in the faith-based Christmas film, Wish for Christmas.

Personal life

Family
Baker is married to an entertainment executive, Keith James Kauffman. They have two sons. The elder son has been diagnosed with dyspraxia.

Opposition to mask mandate for children

On August 12, 2021, Baker spoke in opposition to a decision by the Williamson County Board of Education in Williamson County, Tennessee for a temporary one-month county-wide mask mandate for elementary school students. She supported her opposition by stating that both of her two sons had medical exemptions to COVID-19 vaccines due to past injuries from being vaccinated, because their brains need oxygen to grow and her belief that the mandate was unconstitutional.

Filmography

Live-action filmography

Television

Feature films and television films

Voice-over filmography

Television

Video games

References

External links

"Somewhere in Vegas" audio interview (September 29, 2008)

1972 births
Living people
20th-century American actresses
21st-century American actresses
Actresses from Kentucky
American film actresses
American television actresses
American video game actresses
American voice actresses
People from Murray, Kentucky